Photay is the stage name of Evan Shornstein, an American DJ and electronic music producer from Woodstock, New York.

While a student at Purchase College, Shornstein took a trip to Guinea to study drumming, and the influence of this exposure led to the creation of an EP, released as Photay in 2014 on the label Astro Nautico. He released several remixes for the Ninja Tune label soon after. A full-length album, Onism, followed in 2017 on Astro Nautico. In 2020, a sophomore full-length, Waking Hours, arrived on the label Mexican Summer, and in 2022, he released On Hold, a record stitched together from samples of telephone hold music.

Discography
Albums
Onism (Astro Nautico, 2017)
Waking Hours (Mexican Summer, 2020)
On Hold (Mexican Summer, 2021)
An Offering with Carlos Niño (Self-released, 2022)

EPs
Photay (Astro Nautico, 2014)
Sadie (Astro Nautico, 2016)

References

American electronic musicians
Musicians from New York (state)
Record producers from New York (state)